Marcela Ritschelová (born ) is a retired Czech female volleyball player, who played as a middle blocker. She was part of the Czech Republic women's national volleyball team.

She participated in the 1994 FIVB Volleyball Women's World Championship, and at the 2002 FIVB Volleyball Women's World Championship in Germany. She also competed at the 2001 Women's European Volleyball Championship. On club level she played with Pallavolo Palermo.

Clubs
 Pallavolo Palermo (2002)

References

1972 births
Living people
Czech women's volleyball players
Sportspeople from Ústí nad Labem
Middle blockers